Kolthur is a village in Medchal Malkajgiri district in Telangana, India. It falls under Shamirpet mandal

References

Villages in Ranga Reddy district